Rajgarh may refer to:

Himachal Pradesh
 Rajgarh, Himachal Pradesh

Madhya Pradesh
 Rajgarh State, a former princely state, named after its capital (now in Madhya Pradesh)
 Rajgarh, Madhya Pradesh, capital of the former princely state
 Rajgarh district
 Rajgarh (Lok Sabha constituency)
 Rajgarh, Dhar, a town in Dhar district

Rajasthan
 Rajgarh, Rajasthan (also known as Sadulpur), a town (tehsil HQ) in Churu district
 Rajgarh, Alwar, a town in Alwar district
 Rajgarh, Kota, a village in Kota district